Savani is a surname. Notable people with the surname include:

Cristian Savani (born 1982), Italian volleyball player
Francesco Savani (1723–1772), Italian painter
Mathur Savani, Indian businessman and social worker